The holiday of Easter is associated with various Easter customs and foodways (food traditions that vary regionally). Preparing, coloring, and decorating Easter eggs is one such popular tradition. Lamb is eaten in many countries, mirroring the Jewish Passover meal.

Some regional Easter dishes

In Greece, the traditional Easter meal is mageiritsa, a hearty stew of chopped lamb liver and wild greens seasoned with egg-and-lemon sauce. Traditionally, Easter eggs, hard-boiled eggs dyed bright red to symbolize the spilt Blood of Christ and the promise of eternal life, are cracked together to celebrate the opening of the Tomb of Christ.

Typical of Easter lunches and dinners is the fellata, a banquet of salami and capocollo and salty ricotta. Typical dishes are also lamb or goat baked with potatoes and peas. Easter cake is the pastiera.

In Russia, red eggs, kulich and paskha are Easter traditions.

In Serbia, paretak are traditional Easter pastries.

In Ukraine, there are several traditional Easter foods including paska (bread) and cheesecake desserts.

List of Easter foods

Other Easter foods and food traditions include:

Akvavit
Awara broth, in French Guiana
Babka (cake)
Butter lamb
Cadbury egg
Carrot cake
Chakapuli
Colomba di Pasqua
Cozonac
Easter biscuit
Easter bread
Easter breakfast (see Polish cuisine#Easter breakfast)
Easter bunny (often of the chocolate variety)
Easter eggs
Red Easter eggs
Hot cross bun
Fanesca, in Ecuador
Feseekh, in Egypt
Flaouna
Easter Ham
Koulourakia
Kulich
Leib
Mämmi
Ma'amoul
Mazurek (cake)
Pão-de-Ló and "Folar" in Portugal
Paretak pastries
Paska (bread)
Paskha
Pastiera
Pesaha Appam
Pinca
Peeps
Pogaca (bread)
Salted herring
Sárgatúró in Hungary
Simnel cake
Šoldra
Święconka 
Tsoureki, sometimes lined with red Easter eggs
Habichuelas con dulce, in Dominican Republic

See also
Chiviri
Fat Tuesday
Passover
Pisanica (Croatian)
Śmigus-Dyngus

References

2.History of Easter, Traditions and Recipes